The 2010 FIFA World Cup qualification for the Oceania Football Confederation (OFC) selected New Zealand to compete in a two-legged home-and-away playoff against Bahrain, the fifth-place team from the Asian Football Confederation (AFC) for a spot in the 2010 FIFA World Cup in South Africa. (Oceania is the only confederation that does not have an automatic place in the finals.) Its final round was the 2008 OFC Nations Cup.  Consequently, New Zealand is also considered the OFC Nations Cup champion, and represented the OFC in the 2009 FIFA Confederations Cup.

This was the first OFC World Cup qualifying campaign since Australia's move from the OFC to the AFC.

Format
The first phase began at the 2007 Pacific Games in Samoa, with the football tournament doubling as an OFC World Cup qualifying competition. The gold, silver, and bronze medallists (New Caledonia, Fiji, and Vanuatu, respectively) advanced to the second phase.

The three medallists joined seeded side New Zealand in a home-and-away round-robin tournament on FIFA match dates in 2007 and 2008, also acting as the 2008 OFC Nations Cup.

There were some confusion as to how the final qualifier for the playoff against an AFC nation would be selected. The FIFA website initially indicated that the top two sides from the round robin would advance to a play-off which would determine the qualifier, but the OFC articles did not include this round (with the round-robin winner advancing automatically). Later FIFA articles confirmed that the round-robin winner would advance automatically.

First round

The 2007 South Pacific Games held the first round. The draw was held on 12 June 2007 in Auckland, New Zealand. Tuvalu were not members of FIFA and so would have been unable to qualify for the World Cup had they proceeded to the OFC Nations Cup stage. It was not even clear whether Tuvalu would be eligible to advance that far had they finished in a medal position, as the OFC press release for the second stage draw stated that "nine eligible member associations battle it out for the gold, silver and bronze medals that will hand them a berth in a Stage Two round robin home and away playoff with New Zealand" - implying one nation (Tuvalu) would not be eligible. This question was rendered moot, however, as Tuvalu finished last in their table.

Papua New Guinea, having initially entered the 2010 World Cup and indicated their intention to enter the South Pacific Games, were involved in a dispute with their sporting authorities and failed to meet the official accreditation deadline for the South Pacific Games.  This meant they were effectively disqualified from the World Cup.

Group stage

Group A

Group B

Knockout stage

The three medalists, New Caledonia, Fiji, and Vanuatu, advanced to the 2008 OFC Nations Cup (together with automatic qualifier New Zealand).

Second round

New Zealand qualified for the play-off against the AFC playoff winner, as well as the 2009 FIFA Confederations Cup in South Africa.

Inter-confederation play-offs

The Oceania champion (New Zealand) played the AFC playoff winner, Bahrain, in a two-legged play-off; New Zealand beat Bahrain to qualify for the 2010 World Cup.

The draw for the order in which the two matches would be played was held on 2 June 2009 during the FIFA Congress in Nassau, the Bahamas.

Qualified teams
The following team from OFC qualified for the final tournament.

1 Bold indicates champions for that year. Italic indicates hosts for that year.

Goalscorers
There were 150 goals scored over 38 games (including the intercontinental play-off), for an average of 3.95 goals per game.

12 goals

 Osea Vakatalesau

9 goals

 Seule Soromon

8 goals

 Shane Smeltz

7 goals

 Commins Menapi

6 goals

 Roy Krishna
 François Sakama

5 goals

 Michel Hmaé
 Iamel Kabeu
 Etienne Mermer

4 goals

 Pierre Wajoka
 Henry Fa'arodo
 Benjamin Totori

3 goals

 Pita Baleitoga
 Pita Rabo
 David Mulligan

2 goals

 Teariki Mateariki
 Maciu Dunadamu
 Malakai Kainihewe
 Malakai Tiwa
 Taniela Waqa
 Chris Cahill
 Desmond Fa'aiuaso
 Penitito Tumua
 Godwin Bebeu
 Alick Maemae
 Stanley Waita
 Pio Palu
 Richard Iwai
 Jean Nako Naprapol
 Moise Poida

1 goal

 Ramin Ott
 Thomas Le Mouton
 Kunda Tom
 Josaia Bukalidi
 Peni Finau
 Salesh Kumar
 Valerio Nawatu
 Patrick Diaiké
 Ramon Djamali
 Ramon Gjamaci
 José Hmaé
 Mael Kaudre
 Marius Mapou
 Yohann Mercier
 Poulidor Toto
 Jeremy Christie
 Rory Fallon
 Ben Sigmund
 Ivan Vicelich
 Damien Fonoti
 Junior Michael
 Lionel Taylor
 Judd Molea
 Samson Takayama
 Temarii Tinorua
 Axel Williams
 Unaloto Feao
 Lafeale Moala
 Malakai Savieti
 Kaisani Uhatahi
 Andrew Chichirua
 Derek Malas
 Victor Maleb
 Tom Tomake

1 own goal

 Stephen Willis (for Tuvalu)

References

Oceania zone at FIFA.com
OFC - OFC 2010 FIFA World Cup route via Asia
OFC - Stage two World Cup draw announced
OFC - 2010 Qualification Format

 
OFC
FIFA World Cup qualification (OFC)
qual
qual